Vår bostad (Swedish: Our Dwelling) was a monthly family magazine published in Stockholm, Sweden, between 1924 and 2006.

History and profile
Vår bostad was started in 1924. Between 1935 and early 1937 the title of the magazine was Hus och Härd. The magazine was jointly owned by the Swedish tenant organizations, HSB (Tenant Owners Cooperation) and Hyresgästernas Riksförbund. It was sent to the members of the organizations. The magazine, based in Stockholm, was published by Hyresgästernas Förlag on a monthly basis.

Swedish social democrat politician Ulla Lindström was the long-term editor-in-chief of Vår bostad which she held between 1937 and 1946. Ulrica Ambjörn also served as the editor-in-chief of the magazine, which ceased publication in 2006.

Circulation
In 2001 Vår bostad had a circulation of 972,000 copies. It was the second most read magazine in Sweden in 2005. The circulation of the magazine was 934,000 copies in 2006.

See also
 List of Swedish magazines

References

1924 establishments in Sweden
2006 disestablishments in Sweden
Defunct magazines published in Sweden
Magazines established in 1924
Magazines disestablished in 2006
Magazines published in Stockholm
Monthly magazines published in Sweden
Swedish-language magazines